Alex Nielsen (born 26 March 1958) is a former Danish football goalkeeper.

Biography 
Nielsen is mainly known for his many years as goalkeeper at Vejle Boldklub. He came to VB in 1977 from Fremad Amager and became the first professional player at Vejle Boldklub.

Nielsen made his debut in 1978 against Medan and played his last game for VB in 1987 against the Czech Olympic team. During his time at the club Vejle won the Danish Cup in 1977 and 1981 and the Danish Championship in 1978 and 1984.

External links 
Vejle Boldklub > Statistics
The Crazy Reds > Club History

1958 births
Living people
Danish men's footballers
Denmark international footballers
Denmark under-21 international footballers
Vejle Boldklub players
Hvidovre IF players
Association football goalkeepers